Scott Neyedli (born 16 June 1978 in Aberdeen, Scotland) was a full-time professional Ironman triathlete (2007-2011), winning British and multiple Scottish Triathlon Championships. He is a 2 x Ironman Champion winning Ironman UK in 2007 in a marathon and course record time and Ironman Wales in 2013 with the fastest bike and marathon run splits of the day. More remarkable Scott won Ironman Wales whilst working full-time after resuming his oil and gas engineering career full-time at the start of 2012 due to sponsorship pitfalls. Scott has represented Great Britain at Elite level ITU Championships, placing Top Briton and 9th place at the ITU World Long Distance Triathlon championships in 2011 along with Top Briton placings at the World Ironman Championships in Kona Hawaii. Scott also won European Team Silver at the European Championships in 2007. Scott is still ranked one of the fastest British Ironman athletes and at the top of GB's best medal tally at Ironman Competition (1st Ironman UK 2007, 2nd Ironman UK 2008, 2nd Ironman Western Australia 2009, 2nd Ironman Australia 2010, 1st Ironman Wales 2013) and still holding the current WTC Scottish Ironman record at 8hrs 17 mins 47 sec.

References

1978 births
Living people
Scottish male triathletes